Biassini is a village in the Salto Department of northwestern Uruguay.

Geography

Population
In 2011 Biassini had a population of 345.
 
Source: Instituto Nacional de Estadística de Uruguay

References

External links
INE map of Biassini

Populated places in the Salto Department